Stephen B. Kaufman is a lawyer and former Democratic City Councilman and New York State Assemblyman from the Bronx. In 2004, he ran unsuccessfully for the New York State Senate.

Criticized by New York Courts for "Duplicitous Conduct" in 1978

The New York Supreme Court (Appellate Division) summarized Kaufman's fraud in this way:

In the early summer of 1975, it had been discovered that New York City Councilman, Stephen Kaufman, had deceived the residents of Co-op City by his duplicitous conduct involving the rent strike. He was the only elected public official living in Co-op City but he became unelectable because of his rent strike duplicity. His actions were defended by the regular Democratic Club leadership in the district who were, at best, considered lukewarm in their support of the rent strike. There were regular and reform factions splitting the democratic support outside of Co-op City in the summer, fall and early winter months of 1975-76.

The opinion criticizing Kaufman was authored by Justice Ann T. Mikoll, and it was signed by three other justices (Presiding Justice Greenblott, Justice Larkin, and Justice Herlihy). Another member of the court, Justice Kane, concurred, but only in the result.

Campaign Finance Scandal, 2005-2009

In April 2008, the New York City Campaign Finance Board found that Kaufman's campaign "violated the campaign finance program spending limit during the 2005 primary election campaign."  The Board fined Kaufman and his campaign.

Kaufman appealed to the New York Supreme Court in 2009. He lost the appeal, and the Supreme Court  upheld the fine against him and his campaign.

References

External links
 Our Campaigns: Stephen B. Kaufman

Living people
Democratic Party members of the New York State Assembly
Place of birth missing (living people)
Year of birth missing (living people)
New York City Council members
Politicians from the Bronx